Euseius ahaioensis is a species of mite in the family Phytoseiidae.

References

ahaioensis
Articles created by Qbugbot
Animals described in 1992